"The Inverted Forest" is a novella by J. D. Salinger, first published in Cosmopolitan magazine in December 1947, and republished in Cosmopolitan's "Diamond Jubilee" issue in March 1961. The story marked the start of Salinger's focus on the poet as a distinguished creative genius, and on the impossibilities he finds when trying to adapt to society.

Salinger decided not to have the novella published in the United States in another form. By 2017 the 1947 Cosmopolitan issues with the story were on sale in the U.S. for about $500 each.

Plot summary
The story opens with a diary entry from an eleven-year-old Corinne von Nordhoffen, heiress to a large orthopedic supply company. The young girl laments at the fact that, while others have offered her gifts for her birthday, the real present she wants is Raymond Ford. On the night of her birthday, she waits in vain for him to show. Her driver is directed to head to Ford's house, across town. When they arrive at the address, all they see is a closed restaurant but realize that in fact Ford lives upstairs, with his mother. Corinne talks with Ford briefly as he suddenly exits the apartment with his mother, who chides him for being slow. He is carrying a large suitcase and when asked where he is going he says "I don't know ... goodbye."

At seventeen Corinne was a beautiful but naive student attending Wellesley College. After graduating she goes to Europe and meets many men. One boyfriend dies in a car accident, and Corinne moves to New York City to a "darling, overpriced apartment in the East Sixties." She gets a job after contacting an old friend from college, Robert Waner (who we learn is narrating the story). Waner sets her up as an editor at a magazine. He proposes to her and she rejects him. After some months of working for him, Waner introduces her to the work of a poet (specifically a book of poems called The Cowardly Morning) whose works are "Coleridge and Blake and Rilke all in one, and more." 

The first poem is the title poem; Corinne reads it and "felt sorry for the poet for having her as a reader." She reads through it again and begins to appreciate the symbolism: 
"Not a wasteland, but a great inverted forest/with all the foliage underground."

Corinne is floored by the poem, calls Waner and tries to get more information on the poet. His name is Ray Ford, twice winner of a prestigious fellowship and an instructor at Columbia University (the same college Salinger's Seymour Glass teaches at). Corinne arranges a meeting with Ford, where he tells her what happened to him. As a young man he worked at a smoky race track, running bets for people. He is befriended by a woman who begins to write poems he must read on scraps of paper. Following her advice, he reads them (using her library), then memorizes them, until he has a volume of poetry in his mind. His vision impaired, Ford writes his own poems at this point, with large block lettering. Ford explains that the poetry emerged from him slowly, and with the pain of his life at that time.

Corinne is mesmerized by Raymond Ford and initiates a romantic relationship. The two of them meet regularly at a Chinese food restaurant and talk. She invites him to a party. Reluctantly, he accepts. While there he is quiet until he starts on a poet he admires and impresses the academics at the party without showing off his genius.

Soon after she and Ford are married, Corinne receives a letter in the mail. It is from a Mary Croft, who had noticed the wedding announcement in the New York Times and who wants Ford to read some of her poetry. Corinne invites Croft to their house. When she arrives Ford dismisses her work and asserts "a poet doesn't invent his poetry—he finds it." Ford and Corinne's relationship begins to crack under the stress of the poet's dedication to his work and introspection. Ford leaves Corinne; later, following a lead from a man who turns out to be Croft's estranged husband, Corinne finds Ford living with Croft. Among other things, Croft's husband reveals that his wife is older than she appears (a woman of 31, not a college girl of 20, as she'd claimed to be), and the negligent mother of a ten-year-old son.

Ford lives with Croft in a large Pennsylvania city, in a dilapidated apartment bereft of literature. He is drinking a highball when Corinne shows up to see him. His senses dulled, and his creative output stymied, Ford is a prisoner of "the Brain." This, he explains to Corinne, is his mother: The insensitive and cruel person who had first introduced him to the world of the ignorant and dull. Corinne pleads with him to come back but he doesn't. Instead, Ford, the genius who sees what others can't, closes his eyes to the world of beauty by drowning his perceptions in ether and making himself dependent upon a woman who reincarnates his dead mother.

Translations
Despite the lack of availability of the original novella in its home country, unofficial Persian translations, by 2017, were widely circulated in Iran. The price of each version was 90,000 rials (£2.20). Iran does not recognize various international copyright accords.

References

1947 short stories
Short stories by J. D. Salinger
Works originally published in Cosmopolitan (magazine)